Springdale is a town in Newfoundland and Labrador, Canada, which had a population of 2,965 people in 2021, up from 2,764 in the Canada 2006 Census. The community is located on the Northwestern shores of Hall's Bay in Central Newfoundland, near the mouth of Indian River.

One of the largest towns in north central Newfoundland, the town hosts the Springdale Braves (male) and the Springdale Bravettes (female) hockey teams. They also host the Springdale Bluefins swim team. The town has a small harbour, a hospital, and many recreational facilities, including a hockey rink, curling club, skatepark, tennis courts, a soccer pitch and softball field. Springdale is known as the "hub" of Green Bay, and provides services to a number of communities in the Green Bay North and Green Bay South areas. The town boasts a number of chain restaurants, including Mary Brown's, Subway and Tim Hortons, in addition to locally owned ventures such as Bojo's Restaurant.  The current mayor of Springdale is Alex Goudie.

Springdale has two schools; Indian River Academy, which houses students from Kindergarten to Grade 6, and Indian River High School, which serves students in Grades 7-12. On the outskirts of town is Glassy Beach, which is known for its smooth pieces of broken glass that can be safely walked across in bare feet.

History
The Springdale area was first inhabited by aboriginal peoples, including the Beothuk and Mi'kmaq, and there is evidence to suggest that the Dorset and Maritime Archaic Indians also spent time there.

Hall's Bay takes its name from an ill-fated ship captain who, along with his crew, was killed and decapitated by a group of Beothuk in the mid-18th century. According to local lore, the heads of Captain Hall and his crewmen were found on top of wooden pikes stuck in the ground along the coast of the bay. Like most communities in this region, Springdale is home to many legends centred on the Beothuk people.

The first recorded European settler was Nicholas Peters who, in 1877, constructed a sawmill on Mill Island, near the mouth of Indian River, and approximately 200 metres off the shore of present-day Springdale.  There are several families living in Springdale today who are his direct descendants (with the surnames of Peters or Young), some of whom live on 'Peters Lane'.  This sawmill attracted other settlers, and buildings were soon constructed on the "mainland," across from Mill Island, in a sheltered area called Wolf Cove. In fact, "Wolf Cove" remained the name of the settlement for a number of years.
The sawmill was eventually sold to the Curtis Brothers of Twillingate, and was destroyed by fire in 1890. After the blaze, settlers ceased to live on Mill Island, and moved to Wolf Cove.

In Wolf Cove, there was a freshwater spring that served as a source of water for residents, and in 1897, the community took this spring as its namesake, officially changing "Wolf Cove" to "Springdale". This spring still stands near the waterfront, but has since been covered up because of poor water quality due to pollution from a nearby industry. 

The Mainmast Museum is home to hundreds of artifacts from Hall's Bay's past, some of which date back to the 18th century. The museum is located on the waterfront in Springdale.

The H.C. Grant Heritage Museum is a Municipal Heritage Building (c. 1917-20) on the Canadian Register of Historic Places.

The Springdale Heritage Society tells of the history of Springdale and the surrounding area. It is housed in the refurbished courthouse, originally built in the mid-1950s.

In 2018, Springdale received national attention after the town council voted 4–3 against installing an LGBT pride crosswalk.

Climate
Springdale has a humid continental climate (Koppen: Dfb), with mild to warm summers and chilly winters. Precipitation is reliable year round but peaks in the months of August, October and November.

Demographics 

Notable people
 Natasha Henstridge (1974–), actress and former model

See also
 List of cities and towns in Newfoundland and Labrador

References

External links
Town of Springdale
Springdale - Encyclopedia of Newfoundland and Labrador, vol. 5, p. 279-281.

Populated coastal places in Canada
Towns in Newfoundland and Labrador